Mutley Baptist Church is an evangelical Baptist church and congregation in Mutley Plain, Plymouth, Devon, situated in a large Grade II building, designed by architect J. Ambrose in 1867.

History

Early history
The Baptist Magazine reported that the church was built at the initiative of the congregation of George Street and that the construction started on June 16th, 1867 with the memorial being laid by Mr. Peter Adams, of Plymouth. It also described the style of the building as Venetian-Italian and reported the estimated cost of construction to be around 7000 pounds. The Building News and Engineering Journal reported in 1869 that the construction lasted 16 months and defined the style as Palladian. The church was certified as a place of religious worship on April 20th, 1871.

Present times
In January 2021 the church announced that the Revd Nick Lear was to become the new minister.

Architecture
The church it built of Plymouth limestone in a Classical Style described as French late Gothic /Renaissance or Palladian. It was extended in 1907 to include Spurgeon Hall and is considered a notable example of non-conformist chapel architecture.

Further reading 
A Brief History of Mutley Baptist Church, Plymouth: 1869-1949 Underhill, 1949
Devon (Pevsner Buildings of England) Pevsner Architectural Guides 1989

References

External links 
Official website

1867 establishments
Grade II* listed churches in Devon
Churches in Plymouth, Devon
Churches completed in 1869